Cymindis kalavrytana is a species of ground beetle in the subfamily Harpalinae. It was described by Reitter in 1884.

References

kalavrytana
Beetles described in 1884